The Ivey Purchasing Managers Index (IPMI) is jointly sponsored by the Purchasing Management Association of Canada (PMAC) and the Richard Ivey School of Business. The Ivey Purchasing Managers Index measures month-to-month changes in dollars of purchases as indicated by a panel of purchasing managers from across Canada.

Business indices